D-Day is a 2015 South Korean television series that aired on jTBC on Fridays and Saturdays at 20:40 (KST) time slot for 20 episodes beginning September 18, 2015.

Synopsis
Lee Hae-sung (Kim Young-kwang) is a surgeon who is transferred from one of the best hospitals in Seoul to a rundown hospital with no ER. After disobeying his previous hospital director, Park Gun (Lee Geung-young), he then meets Jung Ddol-mi (Jung So-min), an orthopedic resident from Busan who came to Seoul to transfer a patient. Ddol-mi tries to meet professor Han Woo-jin (Ha Seok-jin), a cold robotics surgeon who works in Hae-seong's old hospital who saved her life when she was younger before going back to Busan. However, she is stuck in Seoul after trying to save a patient. Meanwhile, a sinkhole appears in Seoul followed by a big earthquake that blocks all access to the city, causing phones, electricity, and water to not function. Hae-seong teams up with Ddol-mi to treat people, but soon medicine starts to run out.

Cast

Main
 Kim Young-kwang as Lee Hae-sung 
 Jung So-min as Jung Ddol-mi 
 Ha Seok-jin as Han Woo-jin

Supporting 
 Kim Ki-moo as Cha Ki-woong
 Kim Jung-hwa as Eun So-yool 
 Kim Sang-ho as Choi Il-sub
 Kim Hye-eun as Kang Joo-ran
 Song Ji-ho as Lee Woo-sung
 Yoon Joo-hee as Park Ji-na
 Lee Geung-young as Park Gun
 Lee Kyung-jin as Park Yoon-sook
 Yoo Se-hyung as Yoo-se	
 Shin Cheol-jin as Lee Hae Sung's patient	
 Cha In-pyo as Koo Ja-hyuk
 Lee Sung-yeol as Ahn Dae-gil
 Ko Kyu-pil as Yoo Myung-hyun
 Choi Seung-hoon as Seong Dong-ha
 Jung Yoon-sun
 Han Seo-jin

Ratings
In this table,  represent the lowest ratings and  represent the highest ratings.

References

External links
  

 

South Korean medical television series
2015 South Korean television series debuts
2015 South Korean television series endings
JTBC television dramas
Works about earthquakes
Disaster television series
Television series about firefighting
Television shows set in Seoul
Television series by SM C&C
South Korean pre-produced television series